Nationality words link to articles with information on the nation's poetry or literature (for instance, Irish or France).

Events
Andreas Munch becomes the first person to be granted a poet's pension by the Parliament of Norway.

Works published in English

Canada
 Charles Heavysege, Count Filippo
 Charles Sangster, Hesperus and Other Poems and Lyrics

United Kingdom
 Elizabeth Barrett Browning, Poems Before Congress
 Samuel Lover, Metrical Tales, and Other Poems, illustrated by Hablot Knight Browne, Kenney Meadows and others
 Coventry Patmore, Faithful for Ever (The Angel in the House, Volume 3; see also The Betrothal 1854, The Espousals 1856, The Victories of Love 1863)
 John Leicester Warren, writing under the pen name "George F. Preston", Ballads and Metrical Sketches

United States
 William Turner Coggeshall, editor, Poets and Poetry of the West, anthology
 Paul Hamilton Hayne, Avolio: A Legend of the Island of Cos
 Oliver Wendell Holmes, The Professor at the Breakfast-Table, fiction, nonfiction and verse
 William Dean Howells and John James Piatt, Poems of Two Friends
 Adrien Rouquette, L'Antoniade, ou la solitude avec Dieu
 Edmund Clarence Stedman, Poems, Lyrical and Idyllic
 Henry Timrod, Poems
 Walt Whitman, Leaves of Grass, third edition
 John Greenleaf Whittier, Home Ballads, Poems, and Lyrics

Other
 C. J. Carleton, South Australian Lyrics, Australia
 John Anthony Moore, Tasmanian Rhymings, Australia

Works published in other languages
 Charles Baudelaire, Les paradis artificiels ("Artificial Paradise"), France
 Gul Bakhsh, Kukikatar Puthi (কুকি কাটার পুঁথি), Bengali
 Marceline Desbordes-Valmore, Poésies inédites (posthumous)
 Michael Madhusudan Dutt, Tilottama Sambhab Kabya (তিলোত্তমাসম্ভব কাব্য, "Birth of Tilottama"), Bengali

Births
Death years link to the corresponding "[year] in poetry" article:
 January 10 – Charles G. D. Roberts (died 1943), Canadian poet and writer known as the "Father of Canadian Poetry" because he serves as an inspiration for other writers of his time; also known as one of the "Confederation poets" (together with his cousin Bliss Carman, Archibald Lampman and Duncan Campbell Scott)
 June 1 – Wilfred Campbell (died 1918), Canadian
 August 5 – John Philip Bourke (died 1914), Australian
 September 6 – Lorentzos Mavilis (died 1912), Greek
 September 14 – Hamlin Garland, (died 1940), American novelist, poet, essayist and short story writer
 September 18 – Clinton Scollard (died 1932), American
 October 6 – Rosamund Marriott Watson, born Rosamund Ball and writing as Graham R. Tomson (died 1911), English
 December 8 – Amanda McKittrick Ros, born Anna McKittrick (died 1939), Irish novelist and poet noted for her purple style
 December 12 – Harriet Monroe (died 1936), American editor, scholar, literary critic and patron of the arts, best known as the founder and longtime editor of Poetry magazine
 Date not known:
 Akshay Kumar Boral (died 1919), Indian, Bengali-language poet
 Helena Jane Coleman (died 1953), Canadian music teacher, poet and writer
 Nagesh Vishvanath Pai (died 1920), Indian poet and fiction writer

Deaths
Birth years link to the corresponding "[year] in poetry" article:
 April 6 – James Kirke Paulding (born 1778), American novelist, poet, writer for and sometime owner of Salamagundi magazine and a United States Secretary of the Navy
 August 25 – Johan Ludvig Heiberg (born 1791), Danish
 November 24 – George Croly (born 1780), Irish-born poet, novelist, historian, and clergyman

See also

 19th century in poetry
 19th century in literature
 List of years in poetry
 List of years in literature
 Victorian literature
 French literature of the 19th century
 Poetry

Notes

Poetry
19th-century poetry